State Highway 56 (SH 56) is a Colorado highway that connects Berthoud with Johnstown. SH 55's western terminus is at U.S. Route 287 (US 287) in Berthoud, and the eastern terminus is at Interstate 25 (I-25) and US 87 in Johnstown.

Route description
SH 56 runs , starting at Meadowlark Drive in Berthoud and heading east to a junction with I-25 in Johnstown.

Major intersections

See also

 List of state highways in Colorado

References

External links

056
Transportation in Larimer County, Colorado
Transportation in Weld County, Colorado